Marcionism was an early Christian dualistic belief system that originated with the teachings of Marcion of Sinope in Rome around the year 144. Marcion was an early Christian theologian, evangelist, and an important figure in early Christianity. He was the son of a bishop of Sinope in Pontus. About the middle of the 2nd century (140–155) he traveled to Rome, where he joined the Syrian Gnostic Cerdo.

Marcion preached that the benevolent God of the Gospel who sent Jesus Christ into the world as the savior was the true Supreme Being, different and opposed to the malevolent Demiurge or creator god, identified with the Hebrew God of the Old Testament. He considered himself a follower of Paul the Apostle, whom he believed to have been the only true apostle of Jesus Christ.

Marcion's canon, possibly the first Christian canon ever compiled, consisted of eleven books: a gospel, which was a shorter version of the Gospel of Luke, and ten Pauline epistles. Marcion's canon rejected the entire Old Testament, along with all other epistles and gospels of what would become the 27-book New Testament canon, which during his life had yet to be compiled. Pauline epistles enjoy a prominent position in the Marcionite canon, since Paul was considered by Marcion to be Christ's only true apostle.

Marcionism was denounced by its opponents as heresy and written against by the early Church Fathers – notably by Tertullian in his five-book treatise Adversus Marcionem (Against Marcion), in about 208. Marcion's writings are lost, though they were widely read and numerous manuscripts must have existed. Even so, many scholars claim it is possible to reconstruct and deduce a large part of ancient Marcionism through what later critics, especially Tertullian, said concerning Marcion.

History

According to Tertullian and other writers of early proto-orthodox Christianity, the movement known as Marcionism began with the teachings and excommunication of Marcion around 144. Marcion was reportedly a wealthy shipowner, the son of a bishop of Sinope of Pontus, Asia Minor. He arrived in Rome c. 140, soon after Bar Kokhba's revolt. The organization continued in the East for some centuries later, particularly outside the Byzantine Empire in areas which later would be dominated by Manichaeism.

Schism within Marcionism
By the reign of emperor Commodus (180–192), Marcionism was divided into various opinions with various leaders; among whom was Apelles, whom Rhodo describes as: "... priding himself on his manner of life and his age, acknowledges one principle, but says that the prophecies are from an opposing principle, being led to this view by the responses of a maiden by name Philumene, who was possessed by a demon.

However, others, among whom were Potitus and Basilicus, held to two principles, as did Marcion himself. Others consider that there are not only two, but three natures. Of these, Syneros was the leader and chief.”

Teachings
The premise of Marcionism is that many of the teachings of Christ are incompatible with the actions of the God of the Old Testament. Focusing on the Pauline traditions of the Gospel, Marcion felt that all other conceptions of the Gospel, and especially any association with the Old Testament religion, was opposed to, and a backsliding from, the truth. He further regarded the arguments of Paul regarding law and gospel, wrath and grace, works and faith, flesh and spirit, sin and righteousness, death and life, as the essence of religious truth.  He ascribed these aspects and characteristics as two principles, the righteous and wrathful God of the Old Testament, who is at the same time identical with the creator of the world, and a second God of the Gospel who is only love and mercy.

Marcionites held that the God of the Hebrew Bible was inconsistent, jealous, wrathful and genocidal, and that the material world he created was defective, a place of suffering; the God who made such a world is a bungling or malicious demiurge.

In Marcionite belief, Christ was not a Jewish Messiah, but a spiritual entity that was sent by the Monad to reveal the truth about existence, thus allowing humanity to escape the earthly trap of the demiurge. Marcion called God, the Stranger God, or the Alien God, in some translations, as this deity had not had any previous interactions with the world, and was wholly unknown. See also the Unknown God of Hellenism and the Areopagus sermon.

In various popular sources, Marcion is often reckoned among the Gnostics, but as the Oxford Dictionary of the Christian Church (3rd ed.) puts it, "it is clear that he would have had little sympathy with their mythological speculations" (p. 1034). In 1911 Henry Wace stated:

A primary difference between Marcionites and Gnostics was that the Gnostics based their theology on secret wisdom (as, for example, Valentinius who claimed to receive the secret wisdom from Theudas who received it direct from Paul) of which they claimed to be in possession, whereas Marcion based his theology on the contents of the Letters of Paul and the recorded sayings of Jesus — in other words, an argument from scripture, with Marcion defining what was and was not scripture. Also, the Christology of the Marcionites is thought to have been primarily Docetic, denying the human nature of Christ. This may have been due to the unwillingness of Marcionites to believe that Jesus was the son of both God the Father and the demiurge. Scholars of Early Christianity disagree on whether to classify Marcion as a Gnostic: Adolf von Harnack does not classify Marcion as a Gnostic, whereas G. R. S. Mead does. Harnack argued that Marcion was not a Gnostic in the strict sense because Marcion rejected elaborate creation myths, and did not claim to have special revelation or secret knowledge. Mead claimed Marcionism makes certain points of contact with Gnosticism in its view that the creator of the material world is not the true deity, rejection of materialism and affirmation of a transcendent, purely good spiritual realm in opposition to the evil physical realm, the belief Jesus was sent by the "True" God to save humanity, the central role of Jesus in revealing the requirements of salvation, the belief Paul had a special place in the transmission of this "wisdom", and its docetism. According to the 1911 Encyclopædia Britannica article on Marcion:

Marcionism shows the influence of Hellenistic philosophy on Christianity, and presents a moral critique of the Old Testament from the standpoint of Platonism. According to Harnack, the sect may have led other Christians to introduce a formal statement of beliefs into their liturgy (see Creed) and to formulate a canon of authoritative Scripture of their own, thus eventually producing the current canon of the New Testament.

Marcion is believed to have imposed a severe morality on his followers, some of whom suffered in the persecutions. In particular, he refused to re-admit those who recanted their faith under Roman persecution; see also Lapsi (Christian).

Marcionite canon

Tertullian claimed Marcion was the first to separate the New Testament from the Old Testament.  Marcion is said to have gathered scriptures from Jewish tradition, and juxtaposed these against the sayings and teachings of Jesus in a work entitled the Antithesis. Besides the Antithesis, the Testament of the Marcionites was also composed of a Gospel of Christ which was Marcion's version of Luke, and that the Marcionites attributed to Paul, that was different in a number of ways from the version that is now regarded as canonical.  It seems to have lacked all prophecies of Christ's coming, as well as the Infancy account, the baptism, and the verses were more terse in general. It also included ten of the Pauline epistles, in the following order: Galatians, 1 Corinthians, 2 Corinthians, Romans, 1 Thessalonians, 2 Thessalonians, Laodiceans, Colossians, Philemon, Philippians.

Marcion's Apostolikon did not include the Pastoral epistles or the Epistle to the Hebrews. According to the Muratorian canon, it included a Marcionite pseudo-Paul's epistle to the Alexandrians and an epistle to the Laodiceans. The contents of this Marcionite Epistle to the Laodiceans are unknown. Some scholars equate it with the Epistle to the Ephesians, because the latter originally did not contain the words 'in Ephesus', and because it is the only non-pastoral Pauline epistle missing from the Marcionite canon, suggesting Laodiceans was simply Ephesians under another name. The Epistle to the Alexandrians is not known from any other source; Marcion himself appears to have never mentioned it.

In bringing together these texts, Marcion redacted what is perhaps the first New Testament canon on record, which he called the Gospel and the Apostolikon, which reflects his belief in the writings of Jesus and the apostle Paul respectively. An English language reconstruction of the content of the Evangelion and Apostolikon attested in Patristic sources was published by Jason David BeDuhn in 2013.

The Prologues to the Pauline Epistles (which are not a part of the text, but short introductory sentences as one might find in modern study Bibles), found in several older Latin codices, are now widely believed to have been written by Marcion or one of his followers. Harnack makes the following claim:

Conversely, several early Latin codices contain Anti-Marcionite Prologues to the Gospels.

Comparison

Reaction to Marcion by early Christians

According to a remark by Origen (Commentary on the Gospel of Matthew 15.3), Marcion "prohibited allegorical interpretations of the scripture". Tertullian disputed this in his treatise against Marcion. 

Tertullian, along with Epiphanius of Salamis, also charged that Marcion set aside the gospels of Matthew, Mark and John, and used Luke alone. Tertullian cited Luke 6:43–45 (a good tree does not produce bad fruit) and Luke 5:36–38 (nobody tears a piece from a new garment to patch an old garment or puts new wine in old wineskins), in theorizing that Marcion set about to recover the authentic teachings of Jesus. Irenaeus claimed,

Tertullian also attacked this view in De Carne Christi.

Polycarp, according to Irenaus in his work, Adversus Haereses, had an encounter with Marcion:

Hippolytus reported that Marcion's phantasmal (and Docetist) Christ was "revealed as a man, though not a man", and did not really die on the cross. However, Ernest Evans, in editing this work, observes:

Islamic accounts
The Arabic name for Marcionism, marḳiyūniyya, is attested to by several historical sources of the Islamic Golden Age which appear to reveal that a meager Marcionite community continued to exist in the Near East into the tenth century. For example, the Christian writer Thomas of Margā states that, at the end of the eighth century, the metropolitan of Gēlān and Daylam, Shuwḥālīshōʿ, travelled into the remote parts of his see, preaching "among the pagans, Marcionites and Manichaeans." In a similar way, the tenth-century Muslim bibliographer Ibn al-Nadīm goes so far as to claim that the Marcionites are "numerous in Khurāsān" and that there "they practice openly, like the Manichaeans." Although information about the Khorasanite Marcionites is not related in any other historical source, Ibn al-Nadīm nevertheless also quotes a "reliable informant" (thiḳa), "whom he says had seen Marcionite books and who reported that their script resembled that of the Manichaeans."

Those medieval Muslim writers who specialized in the study of foreign religions often presented Marcionite theology accurately. For example, al-Masʿūdī (d. 956) states that the Marcionites taught "two principles, good and evil, and justice is a third (principle) between the two," which, according to de Blois, are clear references to the Marcionite belief in "the good god, evil matter, and the just god." In the majority of cases, the Islamic references to Marcionism are really references to what has been termed "Neo-Marcionism," a sub-branch of the sect that seems to have lived in Khorasan in the tenth century. The classical Muslim thinkers rejected all types of Marcionite theology as deviations from the truth, and some thinkers, such as Ibn al-Malāḥimī (d. c. 1050) wrote polemics against them as others did against Nicene Christianity. This did not, however, prevent many of the same thinkers from studying the Marcionites from an anthropological or sociological point of view, as is evident from Ibn al-Malāḥimī's extended reference to the customs of the Marcionites.

Recent scholarship

In Lost Christianities, Bart Ehrman contrasts the Marcionites with the Ebionites as polar ends of a spectrum with regard to the Old Testament. Ehrman acknowledges that many of Marcion's ideas are very close to what is currently known as "Gnosticism", especially his rejection of the Jewish God, his rejection of the Old Testament, and his rejection of the material world, and his elevation of Paul as the primary apostle. There were early Christian groups, such as the Ebionites, which did not accept Paul's writings as a part of their canon.

Robert M. Price considers the Pauline canon a single collection of epistles despite the problem which is caused by a lack of knowledge as to how they were collected, when they were collected, who collected them and sent copies of them to the various churches. Price has investigated several historical scenarios and reached the conclusion that Marcion was the first person in recorded history who is known to have collected Paul's writings and sent copies of them to various churches together as a canon. He summarizes,

David Trobisch argues that the evidence which is revealed by comparison of the oldest manuscripts of Paul’s letters proves that several epistles had previously been assembled as an anthology which was published separate from the New Testament, and as a whole, this anthology was then incorporated into the New Testament. Trobisch also argues that Paul was the assembler of his own letters for publication.

See also
 Antinatalism
 Antinomianism
 Antitactae
 Borborites
 Catharism
 Christianity in the ante-Nicene period
 Gnosticism
 List of Gnostic sects
 Manichaeism
 Positive Christianity
 Religion in Nazi Germany
Marcion hypothesis

References

Further reading
 Baker, David L., Two Testaments, One Bible (second edn; Leicester: Inter-Varsity, 1991): pp. 35, 48–52.
 Legge, Francis, Forerunners and Rivals of Christianity, From 330 B.C. to 330 A.D.  (1914), reprinted in two volumes bound as one, University Books New York, 1964. LC Catalog 64-24125.

 Mead, G.R.S., Gospel of Marcion Fragments of a Faith Forgotten, London and Benares, 1900; 3rd Edition 1931.
 Price, Robert M. The Evolution of the Pauline Canon.
Riparelli, Enrico, Il volto del Cristo dualista. Da Marcione ai catari, Peter Lang, Bern – Berlin – Bruxelles – Frankfurt am Main – New York – Oxford – Wien 2008, 368 pp.

External links

 
The Marcionite Research Library

144 establishments
Christian denominations established in the 2nd century
Christian terminology
Heresy in ancient Christianity
Nontrinitarianism
Schisms in Christianity
Mosaic law in Christian theology
 
Nature of Jesus Christ